Troy Mellanson (born 22 December 1981) is an Antiguan and Barbudan footballer, who last played for Old Road in the Antigua and Barbuda Premier Division.

Club career
Mellanson grew up in St. John's, Antigua and Barbuda, and played for both Empire FC and Future Stars F.C. in the Antigua and Barbuda Premier Division, prior to moving to the United States to attend college. He was named a 2005 NAIA All American while at Indiana Wesleyan University and played for the University of South Carolina and Greensboro College.

He later returned to Antigua and played for Old Road.

International career
Mellanson is a full international for the Antiguan national team, and featured in two of its qualifying games for the 2010 World Cup against Cuba on 17 June 2008, and 22 June 2008.

References

External links
 
 Player profile - Greensboro College
 

1981 births
Living people
Antigua and Barbuda footballers
Antigua and Barbuda international footballers
Kalamazoo Outrage players
Expatriate soccer players in the United States
Indiana Wesleyan University alumni
USL League Two players
USC Upstate Spartans men's soccer players
Association football forwards
Association football midfielders